Elections were held in Colorado on Tuesday, November 2, 2010. Primary elections were held on August 10, 2010.

Federal

United States Senate 

Incumbent Senator and Democratic nominee Michael Bennet defeated Republican nominee Ken Buck in the General election.

United States House 

All seven Colorado seats in the United States House of Representatives were up for election in 2010.

State

Governor and Lieutenant Governor

State Senate
One-half of the seats of the Colorado Senate were up for election in 2010.

State House of Representatives
All of the seats in the Colorado House of Representatives were up for election in 2010.

Judicial elections
Multiple judicial positions were up for election in 2010.
Colorado judicial elections, 2010 at Ballotpedia

Ballot measures
Seven measures were certified for the 2010 ballot.
Colorado 2010 ballot measures at Ballotpedia

Local
Many elections for county offices were also held on November 2, 2010.

References

External links
Elections Division of the Colorado Secretary of State
Official candidate list (general)
Candidates for Colorado State Offices at Project Vote Smart
Colorado Smart Voter from the League of Women Voters
Colorado at Ballotpedia
Colorado Election Guide at Congress.org
Colorado at OurCampaigns.com
Colorado Polls at Pollster.com

Finance
2010 House and Senate Campaign Finance for Colorado at the Federal Election Commission
Colorado Congressional Races in 2010 campaign finance data from OpenSecrets
Colorado 2010 campaign finance data from Follow the Money
Media
Election 2010 at The Denver Post

 
Colorado